Leonard Frey (September 4, 1938 – August 24, 1988) was an American actor. Frey received a nomination for the Academy Award for Best Supporting Actor for his role in the 1971 musical film Fiddler on the Roof. He made his stage debut in an Off-Broadway production of Little Mary Sunshine and received a nomination for the Tony Award for Best Featured Actor in a Play for The National Health.

Life & career 
Frey was born in Brooklyn, New York. After attending James Madison High School, he studied art at Cooper Union, with designs on becoming a painter, then switched to acting at New York City's Neighborhood Playhouse under acting coach Sanford Meisner, and pursued a career in theater.

Frey received critical acclaim in 1968 for his performance as Harold in off-Broadway's The Boys in the Band. He appeared with the rest of the original cast in the 1970 film version, directed by William Friedkin.

Frey was nominated for a 1975 Tony Award as Best Featured Actor in a Play for his performance in The National Health. Other stage credits included revivals of The Time of Your Life (1969), Beggar on Horseback (1970), Twelfth Night (1972) and The Man Who Came to Dinner (1980). He also played Clare Quilty in the Alan Jay Lerner musical Lolita, My Love which closed, before reaching Broadway, in 1971.

Frey was nominated for the Academy Award for Best Supporting Actor for his performance as Motel the tailor in Norman Jewison's 1971 film Fiddler on the Roof (he had appeared in the original Broadway musical production as Mendel, the rabbi's son). Other film credits included roles in The Magic Christian (1969), Tell Me That You Love Me, Junie Moon (1970), Where the Buffalo Roam (1980), Up the Academy (1980), and Tattoo (1981).

Frey's television credits included appearances on Hallmark Hall of Fame; Medical Center; Mission Impossible; Eight Is Enough; Quincy, M.E.; Hart to Hart; Barney Miller (1975 episode: 'The Escape Artist' & 1980 episode: 'Vanished', part 2); Moonlighting; Murder, She Wrote; and the miniseries Testimony of Two Men, as well as a co-starring role as the villainous Parker Tillman on the short-lived ABC western comedy Best of the West, and Raymond Holyoke on Mr. Smith, which ran for 13 episodes on NBC in fall 1983. He also appeared as a panelist on the game shows Match Game-Hollywood Squares Hour and Super Password.

On The Mary Tyler Moore Show episode titled "Ted Baxter's Famous Broadcaster's School," airing February 22, 1975, Frey played the role of “The Student.” Frey's final role was Walter Witherspoon in the television movie Bride of Boogedy.

Death
Frey, who was gay, died at age 49 from the complications of AIDS in New York on August 24, 1988, 11 days before his 50th birthday.

Award & nominations

Filmography

References

External links 

 
 
 
 
 

1938 births
1988 deaths
20th-century American male actors
AIDS-related deaths in New York (state)
American male film actors
American male musical theatre actors
American male stage actors
American male television actors
Cooper Union alumni
American gay actors
LGBT Jews
Male actors from New York City
Jewish American male actors
Neighborhood Playhouse School of the Theatre alumni
Musicians from Brooklyn
20th-century American singers
James Madison High School (Brooklyn) alumni
20th-century American male singers